Ernst Severa (21 September 1934 – 3 August 2019) was an Austrian who competed in the four man kayak and who competed in the mid-1960s. He was eliminated in the semifinals of the K-4 1000 m event at the 1964 Summer Olympics in Tokyo.

References
Sports-reference.com profile

External links

1934 births
Austrian male canoeists
Canoeists at the 1964 Summer Olympics
Living people
Olympic canoeists of Austria

Deceased August 3,2019